The Library of America's definitive edition of Philip Roth's collected works (2005–2017) is a series collecting Philip Roth's works. The Library of America's aim is to collect and republish all of Roth's literary output. Originally envisioned as an eight-volume series, the revised plan presents Roth's oeuvre in ten volumes. First published in 2005, ten volumes have been published as of 2017, all edited by Ross Miller, except the last one, by Roth himself.

Volume 1: Novels and Stories 1959–1962
LOA #157: Published August 18, 2005, 913 pages
Goodbye, Columbus (1959)
 Letting Go (1962)

Volume 2: Novels 1967–1972
LOA #158: Published August 18, 2005, 671 pages
When She Was Good (1967)
Portnoy's Complaint (1969)
Our Gang (1971)
The Breast (1972)

Volume 3: Novels 1973–1977
LOA #165: Published October 19, 2006, 900 pages
The Great American Novel (1973)My Life As a Man (1974)The Professor of Desire (1977)

Volume 4: Zuckerman Bound: A Trilogy & Epilogue 1979–1985
LOA #175: Published September 20, 2007, 675 pagesThe Ghost Writer (1979)Zuckerman Unbound (1981)The Anatomy Lesson (1983)The Prague Orgy (1985)
Unproduced television screenplay for The Prague Orgy (1985)

Volume 5: Novels and Other Narratives 1986–1991
LOA #185: Published September 4, 2008, 767 pagesThe Counterlife (1986)The Facts (1988)Deception (1990)Patrimony (1991)

Volume 6: Novels 1993–1995
LOA #205: Published September 2, 2010, 842 pagesOperation Shylock (1993)Sabbath's Theater (1995)

Volume 7: The American Trilogy 1997–2000
LOA #220: Published September 29, 2011, 1088 pagesAmerican Pastoral (1997)I Married a Communist (1998)The Human Stain (2000)

Volume 8: Novels 2001–2007
LOA #236: Published February 7, 2013, 740 pagesThe Dying Animal (2001)The Plot Against America (2004)Exit Ghost (2007)

Volume 9: Nemeses
LOA #237: Published February 7, 2013, 598 pagesEveryman (2006)Indignation (2008)The Humbling (2009)Nemesis (2010)

Volume 10: Why Write?: Collected Nonfiction 1960–2013
LOA #300: Published September 12, 2017, 476 pages
Roth’s selection of Reading Myself and Others (1975)Shop Talk (2001)Explanations'' (fourteen later pieces)

References

External links
Philip Roth at the official Library of America website.

Books by Philip Roth
Series of books